Camp Massad may refer to:
 B'nai B'rith Beber Camp, a Jewish summer camp in Mukwonago, Wisconsin
 Camp B'nai Brith of Montreal, a Jewish summer camp near Lantier, Quebec
 Camp B'nai Brith of Ottawa, a Jewish summer camp near Quyon, Quebec
 B'nai B'rith Perlman Camp, a Jewish summer camp in Wayne County, Pennsylvania

Jewish summer camps